Valle Vista is an unincorporated community and census-designated place (CDP) in Santa Fe County, New Mexico, United States. It was first listed as a CDP prior to the 2020 census.

It is bordered to the east by New Mexico State Road 14, and Interstate 25 passes just to the northwest of the community, with access from Exit 276 (State Road 599/Veterans Memorial Highway). State Road 14 leads south-southwest  to Interstate 40 at Tijeras, while I-25 leads southwest  to Albuquerque and east  to Las Vegas, New Mexico.

Demographics

Education
It is within Santa Fe Public Schools.

References 

Census-designated places in Santa Fe County, New Mexico
Census-designated places in New Mexico